was a Japanese painter of the Shōwa and Heisei eras, who practiced the nihonga style of watercolour painting.

Biography 
Sugiyama was born in 1909 in Asakusa, the eldest son of the owner of a stationery shop. In 1928, Sugiyama enrolled in the Tokyo Art School (now the Tokyo National University of Fine Arts and Music). He formed the "rossogasha" (瑠爽画社) along with Yamamoto Kyujin and Takayama Tatsuo, and participated positively in the movement to  reform nihonga. His paintings are characteristized by peacefulness filled with a sense of security, owing to excellent sketching ability and solid construction.

In 1958, his eldest daughter married Yukio Mishima. As a reason for choosing her, Mishima suggested "because she was the daughter of an artist, so she wouldn't hold to many of the illusions people have about artists".

He received a commission to design the carpets of Tokyo Imperial Palace. His stylized pattern of clouds (kumo) was used in the Shunju-no-Ma, a grand hall with an area of 608 square meters, or about 184 tsubo. He also designed the pattern of grass (kusa), which was used in the Houmei-Den, the largest hall with an area of 915 square meters, or about 280 tsubo.

In 1974, Sugiyama was awarded the Order of Culture.

Famous works
穹 (1964, Tokyo National Museum of Modern Art)

See also
 Gakuryō Nakamura
 Seison Maeda
 Yokoyama Taikan
 Kaii Higashiyama
 List of Nihonga painters

References

1909 births
1993 deaths
20th-century Japanese painters
Nihonga painters
Artists from Tokyo
Recipients of the Order of Culture
Tokyo School of Fine Arts alumni